Roberto Enrique Cáceres Torrealba (born 25 May 1978) is a Chilean former footballer who played as a defender . 

He played for O'Higgins, on loan from Lobos de la BUAP, in 2008. In 2015, he played his final season with Valdivia, before retiring from professional football.

Teams

Player
Universidad de Chile
 Primera División de Chile (1): 2004 Apertura

References
 
 
 Roberto Cáceres at PlaymakerStats

1978 births
Living people
Footballers from Santiago
Chilean footballers
Chilean expatriate footballers
Universidad de Chile footballers
Deportes Concepción (Chile) footballers
Deportes Temuco footballers
Cruz Azul Hidalgo footballers
Lobos BUAP footballers
Club Deportivo Palestino footballers
O'Higgins F.C. footballers
Trasandino footballers
Deportes Linares footballers
Deportes Valdivia footballers
Chilean Primera División players
Ascenso MX players
Tercera División de Chile players
Segunda División Profesional de Chile players
Chilean expatriate sportspeople in Mexico
Expatriate footballers in Mexico
Association football defenders